The 1938–39 Montreal Canadiens season was the 30th season in club history. The team placed sixth in the regular season to qualify for the playoffs. The Canadiens lost in the first round to the Detroit Red Wings 2 games to 1.

Regular season

Final standings

Record vs. opponents

Schedule and results

Playoffs
The NHL revised its playoff format and six of seven teams qualified for the playoffs. In the first round, the Canadiens would meet Detroit, which had finished in fifth place. They lost in a best of three series in 3 games, or 1–2.

 Detroit Red Wings  vs. Montreal Canadiens

Player statistics

Regular season
Scoring

Goaltending

Playoffs
Scoring

Goaltending

Awards and records

Transactions

See also
 1938–39 NHL season

References
Canadiens on Hockey Database
Canadiens on NHL Reference

Montreal Canadiens seasons
Montreal Canadiens
Montreal Canadiens